Elizabeth Little may refer to:

 Betty Little (born 1940), New York State Senator
 Elizabeth Little (tennis) (born 1960), Australian tennis player